Marrowbone is a 2017 English-language Spanish psychological horror mystery drama film written and directed by Sergio G. Sánchez, and starring George MacKay, Anya Taylor-Joy, Charlie Heaton, Mia Goth, and Matthew Stagg. The film tells the story of the titular Marrowbone siblings (MacKay, Heaton, Goth, and Stagg), who relocate from England to their mother's ancestral estate in Maine, where they are faced by a sinister presence at home. Marrowbone was screened in the Special Presentations section at the 2017 Toronto International Film Festival and released in Spain on 27 October 2017 by Universal Pictures.

Plot
In 1968, a woman named Rose Marrowbone brings her four children from England to her childhood home, the Marrowbone Residence, in rural Maine. She urges them to leave their past behind and make new memories. Things start off well, and they make friends with a girl named Allie. However, Rose's health worsens and she dies, leaving behind her children Jack (20), Jane (19), Billy (18) and Sam (5). Before dying, Rose instructs Jack to hide news of her death until he turns 21 and legally able to care for his siblings. Six months later, the person who the family was running from finds the place.

Another six months later, the siblings still live in the house. All the mirrors are hidden or covered to protect them from a "ghost" in the loft, which had apparently been gone for several months. Of all the siblings, only Jack visits the local town to take care of any necessities. He courts Allie, now a library employee, while keeping his past from her. The town lawyer, Tom Porter, is in charge of the Marrowbone estate, and has unrequited affections for Allie.

Tom informs Jack he will come to collect the $200 fee and Rose's signature to finish the paperwork that transfers ownership of the estate to Jack. Desperate for money, Jack uses the "cursed" money of their father. Billy retrieves the money box at a secluded spot on the beach. Jack gives $200 to Tom, and Jane fakes Rose's signature on the papers, concluding the transfer.

After several incidents, the siblings believe the "ghost" is back because they used the money. Billy "returns the money" by climbing on the roof and throwing the box with the rest of the money down the chimney into the attic. Sam sneaks into Rose's old room, where all the mirrors are kept, sees the "ghost" inside a mirror, and is traumatized. At this point, it is heavily implied that the "ghost" was their abusive father, who was bricked up in the attic and starved to death. Jane suggests properly burying him, but Jack dismisses the idea.

After Allie firmly rejects Tom's advances, he gives her a folder containing the investigation on the Marrowbone siblings. The files inside revealed their father, Simon Fairbairn, to be a notorious serial killer who also, it is implied, raped and impregnated his daughter. He was convicted in court, with Jack a key witness, and later broke out of jail. In the house, Jane saw a raccoon being attacked and dragged into the attic and is convinced that Simon is still alive.

Tom is informed his potential employer is no longer interested in an employee, but a partner. He is offered 10% of their share for $5,000, which he doesn't have. Tom believes that the Marrowbone siblings have £10,000, which was listed as missing from Simon Fairbairn's property, and blackmails his eldest son. Billy climbs down the attic to retrieve the box, and barely escapes Simon's assault. Billy confronts Jack about Simon and urges Jack to deal with him together. Their argument is interrupted when Jack faints and has a seizure. Jane decides they must tell Allie the truth. The siblings send Allie their diary. While Allie reads through it, Tom arrives at the house. Seeing the bricked up attic entrance, he is convinced the money is hidden there and tears down the wall.

The diary reveals that when Simon found the house six months ago, Jack locked his siblings inside the attic. He tried to give the money box back to Simon at the secluded place on the beach, but was knocked out by his criminally vengeful father. When Jack regained consciousness, he returned to the house, only to realize Simon had entered the attic through the chimney and killed his younger siblings. After bricking up the attic, Jack prepared to commit suicide, but imagined his younger brothers and sister into existence. Mimicking his equally late mother, Jack begins to "make new memories." He hides all the mirrors to avoid reminding himself that he is alone, and avoids going into the attic for the same reason. The "younger siblings" eventually become alternate personalities within his mind.

After learning the truth, Allie goes to the Marrowbone house and finds Jack's different personalities arguing with each other. She tries to snap him out of it, but he drives her away, unwilling to accept the deaths of his siblings. Noticing Tom's belongings, Allie goes up the attic and finds Jane, Billy and Sam's desiccated corpses, as well as a dying Tom. She confronts a horribly malnourished but still ferocious Simon, while calling out for Jack's alternate personalities for help. Billy cries out to Jack to please let him take care of this. Eventually, Jack lets Billy take over and kills Simon, ending his threat for good.

Some time later, Allie decides to stay and care for Jack after he is released from a psychiatric hospital after twelve weeks (three months). She disregards the doctor's recommendation to make sure Jack takes his medicine, so he will no longer have his younger siblings' personalities dominant within his fractured psyche. She knows that Jack is happier when he believes his little brothers and sister are alive and well. He can still see them playing in the field.

Cast
 George MacKay as Jack Marrowbone
 Anya Taylor-Joy as Allie
 Charlie Heaton as William "Billy" Marrowbone
 Mia Goth as Jane Marrowbone
 Matthew Stagg as Samuel "Sam" Marrowbone
 Kyle Soller as Tom Porter
 Nicola Harrison as Rose Marrowbone
 Tom Fisher as Simon Fairbairn
 Myra Kathryn Pearse as Molly
 Paul Jesson as Doctor
 Robert Nairne as the Monster

Production
In May 2016, it was announced Sergio G. Sánchez would write and direct the film, with J. A. Bayona executive producing, alongside Belen Atienza producing. In July 2016, Anya Taylor-Joy, Mia Goth, George MacKay and Charlie Heaton joined the cast of the film.

Release
The film had its world premiere at the Toronto International Film Festival on 11 September 2017. It was released in Spain on 27 October 2017 by Universal Pictures. Marrowbone was also released theatrically in the United Kingdom on 13 July 2018. It was released digitally on 18 November.

Critical reception
On review aggregator website Rotten Tomatoes, the film has an approval rating of 49% based on 75 reviews, and an average rating of 5.40/10. The website's critical consensus reads, "Marrowbone's effective setting and strong cast can't make up for thinly conceived characters and a story short on genuine scares." On Metacritic, the film has a weighted average score of 63 out of 100, based on 5 critics, indicating "generally favorable reviews".

See also 
 List of Spanish films of 2017

References

External links
 Universal Pictures official site
 
 
 
 

2017 films
2017 horror thriller films
2017 psychological thriller films
2017 thriller drama films
2010s English-language films
2010s horror drama films
2010s mystery drama films
2010s mystery horror films
2010s psychological drama films
2010s psychological horror films
2010s Spanish films
English-language Spanish films
Filicide in fiction
Films about dissociative identity disorder
Films about siblings
Films scored by Fernando Velázquez
Films set in 1968
Films set in country houses
Films set in Maine
Spanish horror drama films
Spanish horror thriller films
Spanish mystery drama films
Spanish psychological thriller films
Spanish thriller drama films
Universal Pictures films